Tianyi may refer to:

Tianyi Pavilion, Ningbo, the oldest existing library in China
Tianyi Square, Ningbo
Tianyi Film Company, one of the biggest film production companies in pre-World War II China
Tianyi UAV
 Tianyi, the proper name of the star 7 Draconis
Tianyi bao, A Chinese anarchist publication in Japan
Luo Tianyi, Chinese vocaloid character